The following plants have leaves that are lyrate:

 Arabidopsis lyrata
 Berlandiera lyrata
 Ficus lyrata
 Leibnitzia lyrata
 Paysonia lyrata
 Quercus lyrata
 Salvia lyrata
 Saussurea costus

Lists of plants
Leaves